Shrikant Moghe (6 November 1929 - 6 March 2021) was an Indian film and theatre actor who has worked in several Hindi and Marathi films. He is better known as Bhaurao Deshmukh in Navri Mile Navryala (1984) and Dadasaheb Korde in Gammat Jammat (1987).

Career
Moghe was famous for his roles in Marathi films like Madhuchandra, Sinhaasan, Gammat Jammat, Umbaratha and Vasudev Balwant Phadke; and Marathi stage plays Varyavarchi Varaat, Tuze Aahe Tujapashi and Lekure Udand Jali.

Personal life
Shrikant Moghe grew up in Kirloskarwadi, near Sangli, in Maharashtra, India.
Shrikant Moghe's son Shantanu Moghe is also an actor, who played Chatrapati Shivaji Maharaj in Zee Marathi serial Swarajyarakshak Sambhaji and father in law of actress Priya Marathe. The late Poet-lyricist Sudhir Moghe (1939-2014) was his younger brother.

Shrikant Moghe died in Pune in March 2021, at the age of 91.

References

External links 
 

1929 births
2021 deaths
Indian male film actors
Indian male stage actors
Male actors in Hindi cinema
Marathi people
Male actors in Marathi cinema
Male actors in Marathi theatre